First Lady of Azerbaijan is the informal title of the wife of the president of Azerbaijan. The current first lady is Mehriban Aliyeva, wife of President Ilham Aliyev, who has held the position since 31 October 2003.

First ladies of Azerbaijan (1918–1920)

First ladies of Azerbaijan Soviet Socialist Republic (1922–1991)

First Ladies of Azerbaijan (since 1991)

References

Azerbaijan